"Love of a Lifetime" is a song recorded by American country music group Larry Gatlin and the Gatlin Brothers. Written by Larry Gatlin, it was released in February 1988 as the lead single from their album Alive & Well...Livin' in the Land of Dreams. The song peaked at number four on the Billboard Hot Country Singles chart. It was their last top ten single.

Charts

Weekly charts

Year-end charts

References

1988 singles
1988 songs
Larry Gatlin songs
Columbia Records singles
Songs written by Larry Gatlin